Marin Čilić defeated Félix Auger-Aliassime in the final, 7–6(7–2), 6–3, to win the singles tennis title at the 2021 Stuttgart Open. It was Čilić's 19th career ATP Tour singles title, his first in three years, and he did not drop a set en route to the victory. The No. 47-ranked 32-year-old Čilić also became the lowest-ranked winner since Juan Carlos Ferrero in 2011 and the third-oldest champion in tournament history. 2019 finalist Auger-Aliassime was contesting for his first career singles title in his eighth final.

Matteo Berrettini was the defending champion from when the event was last held in 2019, but he could not participate as he was still competing at the 2021 French Open upon the beginning of the tournament.

Seeds
The top four seeds received a bye into the second round.

Draw

Finals

Top half

Bottom half

Qualifying

Seeds

Qualifiers

Lucky loser

Draw

First qualifier

Second qualifier

Third qualifier

Fourth qualifier

References

External links
Main draw
Qualifying draw

2021 ATP Tour
2021 Singles